Rashk-e Olya or Rashk Olya, also known as Rashk-e Bala, may refer to:
 Rashk-e Olya, Fars (راشكعليا - Rāshk-e ‘Olyā)
 Rashk-e Olya, Kerman (رشک عليا - Rashk-e ‘Olyā)